Gary Metro Center (also known as the Adam Benjamin Metro Center) is a multimodal commuter hub operated by the Gary Public Transportation Corporation. It was built in 1984 as an elevated replacement of the previously ground-level Broadway Street Station. 

It serves as the central bus terminal and the Downtown Gary station on the South Shore Line. It also serves as a stop for Greyhound Lines and other intercity bus systems.

It is one of three NICTD electric train stations in Gary, and serves the Genesis Convention Center and the U.S. Steel Yard baseball park, home of the Gary SouthShore RailCats baseball team. The RailCats's full name, SouthShore RailCats, honors the South Shore Line. 

The station is just south of the Indiana Toll Road (I-90) and the disused Gary Union Station. The tracks of the former Baltimore and Ohio (now CSX) and New York Central Railroads (now Norfolk Southern) also lie near the station.

Structure

The station consists of a single elevated low-level island platform with mobile wheelchair lifts to allow passengers with disabilities to board and disembark. The platform can be accessed from the second floor of stairs located adjacent to Broadway as well as via the second floor of the station building.

Bus connections
GPTC

Local Routes
 Route L1: E. 35th Avenue/Marshalltown
 Route L2: Oak/County Line via Aetna
 Route L3: West 6th Avenue/Tolleston/Village
 Route L5: Horace Mann/Village via Taft Street
 
Regional Routes
 Route R1: R1: Lakeshore Connection
 Route R3: Burr Street and Lake Ridge
 Route R-BMX: Broadway Metro Express

Greyhound Lines

References

External links
 
 South Shore Line - Stations
 South Shore Railfan.net
 Station from Google Maps Street View

South Shore Line stations in Indiana
Railway stations in the United States opened in 1984
Transportation in Gary, Indiana
Bus stations in Indiana
Transportation buildings and structures in Lake County, Indiana
Railway stations in Lake County, Indiana
1984 establishments in Indiana